John & Emery McClung were musicians who recorded old-time music during the 1920s.  They also recorded as The West Virginia Snake Hunters and The McClung Brothers.  John Edward McClung (who was the guitar player and singer) was born on August 1, 1906, in Mount Hope, West Virginia, and died on February 15, 1991.  Emery Samuel McClung (who was the fiddle player) was born on January 3, 1910, in Beckley, West Virginia, and he died on March 9, 1970.

Biography

John and Emery were sons of Caroline Elizabeth Cheetham and Park Walker McClung who were from Raleigh County, West Virginia.  Their father Walker was a jeweler but he was also a music teacher and a choir leader of the church they attended in Sprague, West Virginia.  Many of Walker's fourteen children learned to play instruments or sing from him.

The failing health of their father led John and Emery to start making music on Beckley street corners to help raise grocery money.  In the early 1920s, they formed a string band called The West Virginia Trail Blazers, which included George Ward and John Lanchester, both from Beckley, West Virginia.  They took their shows all around the mountains in a big Studebaker, even going to California on one occasion.  This band was kept together until about 1934.

In 1927, John and Emery recorded eight songs for Brunswick Records.  John played the fiddle and Emery played guitar.  The whistling on the songs "Standin' In The Need Of Prayer," "Birdie," and "The Fun Is All Over" were provided by future Country Music Hall of Fame member Carson Robison.  They also called themselves The West Virginia Snake Hunters during this time, and started working with carnival musician Cleve Chaffin, who was from Wayne County, West Virginia.  Chaffin and the McClung Brothers recorded six songs for Paramount Records in 1929.  Chaffin had also recorded with another old-time music band, Fruit Jar Guzzlers.  After the session for Paramount, Chaffin and the McClung Brothers never recorded again.  Later on, the McClung Brothers had a gospel quartet on the radio station WJLS in Beckley.  John won an old-time fiddlers' contest in Beckley in August 1950, and Emery won second place.  John lived his retired life in Alexandria, Virginia.

One of the most popular McClung Brothers' songs was "The West Virginia Hills," which was a parody of the West Virginia state anthem about West Virginia moonshine.  The McClungs never recorded it but their friend Roy Harvey (also from West Virginia) recorded it as a duet with Earl Shirkey on Columbia Records in 1929.  Harvey's version can be found on two CD's "Roy Harvey: Complete Recorded Works In Chronological Order Volume 3" (Document #8052) and "Roy Harvey: Early String Band Favorites" (Old Homestead #4017), both released in 1999.

Singles

The West Virginia Snake Hunters

 Standin’ In The Need Of Prayer/Walk In The Streets Of Glory (Brunswick #119) (3/1927)

John & Emery McClung
 Birdie/The Fun Is All Over (Brunswick #134) (3/1927) (released 5/1927)
 Chicken/Liza Jane (Brunswick #135) (3/1927)
 It’s A Long Way To Tipperary/When You Wore A Tulip (Brunswick #136) (3/1927)

Cleve Chaffin & The McClung Brothers
 Babylon Is Falling Down/I Got A Home In The Beulah Land (Paramount #3160) (3/1929)
 Trail Blazer's Favorites/Alabama Jubilee (Paramount #3161) (3/1929)
 Rock House Gamblers/Curtains Of Night (Paramount #3170) (3/1929)

Various artists compilations
 My Rough And Rowdy Ways Volume One (Yazoo #2039) (1998)
 Old Time Music Of West Virginia Volume One (County #CD-3518) (1999)
 Old Time Music Of West Virginia Volume Two (County #CD-3519) (1999)
 The Half Ain’t Never Been Told Volume Two (Yazoo #2050) (1999)
 Old Country Gospel (Vintage78 #C-11) (cassette)
 Country Music Classic (Vintage78 #C-53) (cassette)
 Paramount Old Time Recordings (JSP) (3-CD set) (2006)
 Old Time Tunes And Songs Volume 2: 1924-1952 (B.A.C.M #364) (2012)

Notes

External links
  Honking Duck - Listen to "The Fun Is All Over"
  Bluegrass Messenger - Lyrics to "Chicken"
  Hillbilly Music
  McClung Genealogy
  John Edward McClung's Find A Grave Memorial
  Emery Samuel McClung's Find A Grave Memorial

Old-time bands
Sibling musical duos
American musical duos
Folk music duos
People from Beckley, West Virginia
People from Mount Hope, West Virginia
Musical groups from West Virginia
20th-century American musicians